The California School of Professional Psychology (CSPP) was founded in 1969 by the California Psychological Association. It is part of the for-profit Alliant International University where each campus's Clinical Psychology Psy.D. and Ph.D. program is individually accredited by the American Psychological Association. The school has trained approximately half of the licensed psychologists in California.

The school has degree programs in clinical psychology, marriage and family therapy, clinical counseling, Organizational Psychology, and psychopharmacology at campuses in San Francisco, Los Angeles, San Diego, Fresno, Sacramento, and Irvine, and abroad in Tokyo, Hong Kong and Mexico City. CSPP is one of a handful of APA- accredited schools that also offered a clinical doctoral respecialization in professional psychology.

History 
The California School of Professional Psychology (CSPP) was founded in 1969 under the guidance of the California Psychological Association. CSPP was the first free-standing school of professional psychology in the United States.

CSPP educates master's and doctoral-level psychologists in professional practice models and assures that its students and faculty are as diverse as the State of California. At its founding, CSPP worked out of borrowed or rented space with a volunteer (unpaid) faculty, but had a large number of student applicants who were attracted to the new training model.

The founding president of CSPP was Nick Cummings, Ph.D., who was succeeded by John O'Neill and subsequently by Judith Albino, Ph.D. (Mary Beth Kenkel, Ph.D. and Rodney L. Lowman, Ph.D. also served as interim presidents.) During the 2000s, under Albino's tenure, CSPP was renamed Alliant University, and the four separately accredited campuses—Fresno, Los Angeles, San Diego, and San Francisco—were combined into a single WASC-accredited institution. The name was subsequently changed to Alliant International University after Alliant merged with United States International University (USIU), based in San Diego. Today, CSPP is one of several schools that comprise Alliant International University including a school of education, forensic psychology, management and leadership, and a law school. CSPP remains the largest of the schools.

CSPP was first accredited by the Western Association of Schools and Colleges (WASC) in 1977. By the mid-1980s all of its Clinical Psychology programs were accredited by the American Psychological Association. Its Marriage and Family Therapy programs are accredited by the Commission on Accreditation for Marriage and Family Therapy Education of the American Association of Marriage and Family Therapy (AAMFT), and its Master of Arts in Clinical Counseling is accredited by the Council for Accreditation of Counseling & Related Educational Programs (CACREP). Each psychology doctorate degree program (Ph.D. or Psy.D.) on each campus is accredited individually by the American Psychological Association.

Program degrees 
CSPP degree programs:
 Clinical Psychology – Ph.D. and Psy.D.
 Marriage and Family Therapy – MA and Psy.D.
 Clinical Counseling Psychology – MA (licensure as LPCC)
 Industrial-Organizational Psychology (Organization Behavior/ Development) – MA, Ph.D., Psy.D.
 Psychopharmacology – Post-doctoral MS
 Doctoral Respecialialization in Professional Psychology

Accreditation 
 Alliant International University is accredited by the Western Association of Schools and Colleges (WASC)
 Clinical Psychology Psy.D. and Ph.D. programs are individually accredited by the American Psychological Association at every campus.
 Marriage and Family Therapy programs is accredited by the Commission on Accreditation for Marriage and Family Therapy Education of the American Association of Marriage and Family Therapy (AAMFT).

Awards 
The Los Angeles PsyD in Clinical Psychology program was the 2010 recipient of the Suinn Minority Achievement Program Award from the American Psychological Association for excellence in recruitment, retention, and graduation of ethnic minority students, and for its overall commitment to cultural diversity in all department activities.

Notable current and former professors 
Current and former professors include:

 Maurizio Andolfi
 Iván Böszörményi-Nagy
 John V. Caffaro
 Sean Davis
 Sharon L. Foster
 James Framo
 Viktor Frankl
 Edwin Friedman
 Debra F. Glaser
 Jay Haley
 Susan Johnson
 Rodney L. Lowman
 Abraham Maslow
 Valory Mitchell
 Rhoda Olkin
 Norman Paul
 Susan Regas
 Carl Rogers
 Virginia Satir
 Carl Whitaker
 Alan S. Kaufman
 Hadas Pade
 David B Cheek
 Alvin Talkoff
Andrew Curry

Notable alumni 
 Andrea Anderson, psychologist, founder, and Director of The Help Couch
 Phil Barnhart, member of the Oregon House of Representatives
 Judy Chu, first Chinese-American woman elected to the United States Congress
 Robin Corsiglia, former Olympic swimmer, sports psychologist at University of Southern California (USC) University Park Health Center
 Christine E. Dickson, American cognitive psychologist
 Peggy Drexler, Cornell University professor and author
 Lisa Firestone, author, editor of PsychAlive, and Director of Research and Education at The Glendon Association
 Missy Gold, former child actress
 Gordon Muir Giles, psychologist and researcher, professor at Samuel Merritt University, known for his research in traumatic brain injury
 Debra F. Glaser, former and first female chief psychologist for the Los Angeles Police Department, first psychologist to be an ABPP Board Certified in Police and Public Safety Psychology, professor at Alliant International University
 Nathan Hare, author, activist, former associate professor at Howard University, member of the NAACP team that argued Brown v. Board of Education
 Marc Kern, author and addiction treatment specialist
 Davina Kotulsi, author and LGBT advocate
 Glenn S. Lipson, director of Program Forensic Psychology Department Alliant International University San Diego Campus
 Kevin F. McCready, psychologist, founder, and director of the San Joaquin Psychotherapy Center and the non-profit Recovery for Emotionally Abused Children (R.E.A.Ch.)
 Rose Weahkee, director Division of Behavioral Health, Indian Health Service, U.S. Department of Health and Human Services (HHS)
 Matt McGovern, CEO Silver Creek Energy, former CEO Cypress Creek Renewables, CFO Paramount Equity and Gehrlicher Solar America Corp., avid surfer and skateboarder

References

External links 
 CSPP official website

Alliant International University
Psychology institutes
For-profit universities and colleges in the United States
Private universities and colleges in California
Private universities and colleges in Mexico
Universities and colleges in Los Angeles County, California
Universities and colleges in Orange County, California
Universities and colleges in Sacramento County, California
Universities and colleges in San Diego
Universities and colleges in San Francisco
Universities and colleges in Hong Kong
Universities and colleges in Tokyo
Educational institutions established in 1969
1969 establishments in California
Psychology organizations based in the United States